Emmanuel Deutz (1763-1842) was a German-born French rabbi.

Biography
Emmanuel Deutz was born in 1763 in Bonn, Germany.

Deutz served as a rabbi in Koblenz, Germany. He served as the Chief Rabbi of France from 1810 to 1842. Nevertheless, Deutz was not a fluent French speaker.

Deutz had a wife, Judith, and five children. His daughter Sarah married David Paul Drach. When Drach converted to Roman Catholicism, the couple separated. Meanwhile, one of Deutz's sons, Simon Deutz, also converted to Roman Catholicism.

Deutz died in 1842.

References

1763 births
1842 deaths
Clergy from Bonn
German emigrants to France
Chief rabbis of France
19th-century French rabbis
18th-century German rabbis